Mohd Nor Umardi Rosdi (born 11 August 1986) is a Malaysian cyclist, who last rode for UCI Continental team .

Major results

2012
 1st Stage 1 Tour de Brunei
2013
 CFI International Race
1st Delhi
4th Mumbai
9th Jaipur
 2nd Time trial, National Road Championships
2014
 10th Overall Jelajah Malaysia
2015
 2nd Road race, National Road Championships
2016
 1st  Time trial, National Road Championships
2019
 3rd Time trial, National Road Championships

References

External links

1986 births
Living people
Malaysian male cyclists
Malaysian people of Malay descent
20th-century Malaysian people
21st-century Malaysian people